Benton City is a city in Benton County, Washington, United States. The population was 3,479 at the 2020 census. The city shares a school district with the adjacent unincorporated community of Kiona.

History

Pre-incorporation
Benton City was originally platted by the North Coast Railroad in 1909. The line was originally conceived as the North Coast Railroad in 1909, then came under ownership of the Oregon Washington Railroad and Navigation Company in 1913 when North Coast was merged with Oregon Railroad and Navigation Company before becoming part of the Union Pacific Railroad.  It took its name from Benton S. Groscup (and not the county's namesake), who was influential in the separation of Benton County from Yakima County. Freight and passenger depots were built by the railroad in 1910.

Post-incorporation
The town was officially incorporated July 2, 1945. Irrigation water was brought to the area via the Sunnyside Canal in 1947, allowing the area to grow considerably.

In 2002, the Benton City – Kiona Bridge over the Yakima River at Benton City was added to the National Register of Historic Places.

Annual events
 Annual Winterfest
 Benton City Daze
 Antique car shows

Geography
Benton City is located near the center of Benton County at  (46.267872, -119.488230). It is situated on the inside of a bend on the north side of the Yakima River. The unincorporated community of Kiona is along the southern border of the city.

Interstate 82 and U.S. Route 12 pass through Benton City south of the Yakima River, with access from Exit 96.

Topography

Climate

Demographics

2010 census
As of the census of 2010, there were 3,038 people, 1,086 households, and 738 families residing in the city. The racial makeup of the city was 78.6% White, 0.4% African American, 1.1% Native American, 0.3% Asian, 0.1% Pacific Islander, 16.3% from other races, and 3.2% from two or more races. Hispanic or Latino of any race were 28.5% of the population.

There were 1,086 households, of which 38.9% had children under the age of 18 living with them, 47.1% were married couples living together, 14.7% had a female householder with no husband present, 6.2% had a male householder with no wife present, and 32.0% were non-families. 24.8% of all households were made up of individuals, and 7.6% had someone living alone who was 65 years of age or older. The average household size was 2.80 and the average family size was 3.38.

The median age in the city was 32.8 years. 30.1% of residents were under the age of 18; 9.3% were between the ages of 18 and 24; 26.5% were from 25 to 44; 24.8% were from 45 to 64; and 9.5% were 65 years of age or older. The gender makeup of the city was 50.6% male and 49.4% female.

2000 census
As of the census of 2000, there were 2,624 people, 894 households, and 660 families residing in the city. The population density was 1,507.8 people per square mile (582.3/km). There were 1,043 housing units at an average density of 599.3 per square mile (231.4/km). The racial makeup of the city was 84.34% White, 0.15% African American, 1.14% Native American, 0.61% Asian, 0.04% Pacific Islander, 10.63% from other races, and 3.09% from two or more races. Hispanic or Latino of any race were 19.51% of the population.

There were 894 households, out of which 44.6% had children under the age of 18 living with them, 54.4% were married couples living together, 11.3% had a female householder with no husband present, and 26.1% were non-families. 21.5% of all households were made up of individuals, and 7.2% had someone living alone who was 65 years of age or older. The average household size was 2.94 and the average family size was 3.44.

In the city, the age distribution of the population shows 34.7% under the age of 18, 8.5% from 18 to 24, 28.8% from 25 to 44, 19.7% from 45 to 64, and 8.2% who were 65 years of age or older. The median age was 30 years. For every 100 females, there were 104.7 males. For every 100 females age 18 and over, there were 102.5 males.

The median income for a household in the city was $33,636, and the median income for a family was $43,036. Males had a median income of $32,464 versus $22,137 for females. The per capita income for the city was $13,971. About 11.7% of families and 15.7% of the population were below the poverty line, including 16.5% of those under age 18 and 2.0% of those age 65 or over.

Landmarks
Brown's Rock
Kendall Barn
Rancho Los Arados

Notable people
James Otto, country musician, graduated from Kiona-Benton High School

See also
 Red Mountain AVA
 Kiona-Benton City School District

References

External links
 Benton City official website
 Kiona-Benton City School District
 Kiona-Benton City Heritage, digitized historic resources from the Benton City branch of Mid-Columbia Libraries and the Kiona-Benton Historical Society
 Benton City Area Photos
 Tri-City Regional Chamber of Commerce

Cities in Benton County, Washington
Cities in Washington (state)
Populated places on the Yakima River